John Strange (June 27, 1852 – May 28, 1923) was an American politician and businessman and served as the 21st Lieutenant Governor of Wisconsin.

Early life
Strange was born in Oakfield, Wisconsin on June 27, 1852. As a boy, he attended the district schools part of the year and worked in various woodenware factories for part of the year.

Career
After attending Beloit College, Strange was a schoolteacher in Rock County, Wisconsin, and Clinton County, Iowa, until 1871; then he was a grocery clerk in Minneapolis. He worked in powder, flour, and woodware mills and built and sold the first store in Dale, Outagamie County. He also managed a retail lumber yard for two years in Iowa.

In 1899, Strange moved to Neenah, Wisconsin and established a sawmill in the nearby town of Menasha. He was elected the 21st Lieutenant Governor of Wisconsin in 1908, and served one term, from 1909 until 1911.

After his term ended, Strange carried out a career in business; he was president of the John Strange Paper Company, the John Strange Pail Company and the Stevens Point Pulp and Paper Company, as well as the director of R. McMillian Company.

During World War I, Strange, who was a supporter of Prohibition, gave a speech denouncing Wisconsin's German brewers and linking them to the United States's wartime enemies, saying, "the worst of all our German enemies, the most treacherous, the most menacing, are Pabst, Schlitz, Blatz and Miller."

Death
Strange died unexpectedly on May 28, 1923 in Neenah, Wisconsin when he dropped dead while giving a speech at a Rotary dinner. He is interred at Oak Hill Cemetery, Neenah, Wisconsin.

Family life
The son of Thomas and Martha Dixon Strange, he married Mary Margaret McGregor on July 11, 1876 and they had two daughters, Katherine Strange McMillan and Ethel M. Strange McLaughlin; and two sons, Hugh McGregor Strange and John Paul Strange.

References

External links
 Wisconsin Blue Book 

1852 births
1923 deaths
American temperance activists
Lieutenant Governors of Wisconsin
People from Oakfield, Wisconsin
Businesspeople from Wisconsin
Wisconsin Republicans
American Presbyterians
Beloit College alumni
Schoolteachers from Wisconsin
Burials in Wisconsin